Stephen Drury may refer to:

 Stephen Drury (mathematician), Canadian mathematician
 Stephen Drury (musician) (born 1955), American musician